Camilo Menéndez Tolosa (8 February 1899 – 19 June 1971) was a Spanish general who served as Minister of the Army of Spain between 1964 and 1969, during the Francoist dictatorship.

References

1899 births
1971 deaths
Defence ministers of Spain
Government ministers during the Francoist dictatorship